Merfyn Jones (30 April 1931 – 4 October 2016) was a Welsh professional footballer who played for, among others, Scunthorpe United, Crewe Alexandra and Chester. Jones was born in Bangor, Gwynedd. He famously scored one of lowly Crewe's two goals in a historic 2–2 FA Cup Fourth Round tie against Tottenham Hotspur on 30 January 1960. His death was announced in October 2016.

References

External links
Mervyn Jones (1931–2016), Bangor City FC

1931 births
2016 deaths
Footballers from Bangor, Gwynedd
Association football wingers
Welsh footballers
Liverpool F.C. players
Scunthorpe United F.C. players
Crewe Alexandra F.C. players
Chester City F.C. players
Lincoln City F.C. players
English Football League players
Bangor City F.C. players